Zoran Racić (Serbian Cyrillic: Зоран Рацић) is a Serbian retired footballer who played for FK Partizan.

He is perhaps best known for having his leg broken by Sloboda Tuzla player Jusuf Hatunić. Racić never played a match again while Hatunić was later signed by Partizan.

References

Serbian footballers
Association football midfielders
FK Partizan players
Year of birth missing